The Metro Manila Film Festival Award for Best Original Story is an award presented annually by the Metropolitan Manila Development Authority (MMDA). It was first awarded at the 1st Metro Manila Film Festival ceremony, held in 1975; Ophelia San Juan won the award for her original story in Kapitan Kulas and it recognizes the best script not based upon previously published material. Currently, nominees and winners are determined by Executive Committees, headed by the Metropolitan Manila Development Authority Chairman and key members of the film industry.

Winners and nominees

1970s

1980s

1990s

2000s

2010s

Multiple awards for Best Original Story
Throughout the history of Metro Manila Film Festival (MMFF), there have been story-writers who received multiple Awards for Best Original Story. As of 2015 (41st MMFF), 7 story-writers have received two or more Best Original Story awards.

Notes

References

External links
IMDB: Metro Manila Film Festival
Official website of the Metro Manila Film Festival

Original Story